Thacker is an unincorporated community in Mingo County, West Virginia, United States. Thacker is located along the Tug Fork across from the state of Kentucky.

The community takes its name from nearby Thacker Creek.

References

Unincorporated communities in Mingo County, West Virginia
Unincorporated communities in West Virginia
Coal towns in West Virginia